Codium spinescens is a species of seaweed in the Codiaceae family.

In Western Australia is found along the coast around the Abrolhos Islands extending along the south coast as far as the  Head of the Bight in South Australia.

References

spinescens
Plants described in 1956